Grace Barker (born 20 February 1998, Brighton),  known professionally as Gracey (stylised in all caps), is an English singer who made her breakthrough in 2020 when she collaborated with 220 Kid on the BRIT nominated single "Don't Need Love". The song reached a peak of number 9 for two weeks on the UK Singles Chart.

Gracey's family consists of her mother who worked in production at the BBC, her father in the advertising industry, and two older brothers. Her family moved to Haywards Heath and she started songwriting as a child, writing a song titled "Pinky Finger" when she was seven years old. She credits her dyslexia with helping her become more creative, and she went on to study musical theatre at the BRIT School in London from 2012 to 2016. Through writing demos of pop songs and uploading them to SoundCloud, she was invited by Brian Higgins to join production team Xenomania at the age of sixteen. Her first professionally-recorded song was "By Your Side" by Jonas Blue featuring Raye, which went on to be certified platinum in the UK. Gracey's first single, "Different Things", was released in March 2019 and written as a demo for Little Mix. She has also written songs for Sub Focus, Rita Ora, Olly Murs, and Kylie Minogue. Following "Don't Need Love", she released "Empty Love", a collaboration with Australian singer Ruel. Due to the COVID-19 pandemic she was forced to postpone her first headline tour, which was due to take place in May 2020.

In an interview with MTV, Gracey lists her biggest music influences as Sia, The 1975, Lorde, Joni Mitchell, and Robyn. In 2019, she underwent surgery for vocal cord nodules. In January 2023, she revealed she had parted ways with her former label, Polydor and is now an independent artist.

Discography

Mini-albums

Extended plays

Singles

As lead artist

As featured artist

Guest appearances

References

21st-century English women singers
21st-century English singers
English women pop singers
English women singer-songwriters
Living people
People educated at the BRIT School
musicians from Brighton and Hove
People from Haywards Heath
Musicians with dyslexia
Polydor Records artists
Xenomania
Year of birth uncertain
1998 births